Małgorzata Kotowska also known as Małgorzata Durantówna (died 1690) was a Polish lady-in-waiting, and inofficial diplomatic emissary. 

Małgorzata Kotowska was born to a French tailor in France as Marguerite Durant. The family emigrated to Warsaw in Poland during her childhood. In 1659 she married 	Adam Kotowski, a court official who was ennobled in 1673. At the royal Polish court, she made the acquaintance of the new French Queen of Poland, Marie Casimire Louise de La Grange d'Arquien, who had several French favorites, and who appointed her lady-in-waiting. She became the trusted confidante of the queen, who was heavily active in state affairs through her influence on her husband the king. 

In 1679, queen Marie Casimire sent her as her informal political ambassador to the emperor to find out the view of the emperor concerning and alliance between the emperor and Poland against Turkey. 
After her visit to the emperor, Małgorzata Kotowska continued to the court of Cosimo III de' Medici in Florence, and finnally to the Republic of Venice in the same diplomatic mission. 

In Warsaw, Małgorzata Kotowska held receptions for the foreign diplomats in her residence, and acted as the go-between and an informer of the queen. Her important and influential power position was widely acknowledged. She was described as pious and discreet.

References 

 https://www.historiaposzukaj.pl/wiedza,osoby,326,osoba_malgorzata_kotowska.html
 https://www.wilanow-palac.pl/w_sluzbie_jej_krolewskiej_mosci_dzialalnosc_malgorzaty_z_durantow_kotowskiej_w_kregu_spraw_krolowej_marii_kazimiery_w_latach_1675_1699.html
 http://www.polskaniezwykla.pl/web/place/17055,warszawa-od-chlopa-panszczyznianego-do-szlachcica.html

1690 deaths
17th-century Polish women
Polish ladies-in-waiting